Erwin Glonnegger (19 May 1925, Aulendorf - 6 February 2016, Ravensburg) was a German writer and game designer for the company Ravensburger; he was the inventor of the game Concentration.

References

External links
Biographical documentary on Glonnegger

1925 births
2016 deaths
People from Aulendorf
People from the Free People's State of Württemberg
German male writers
Writers from Baden-Württemberg
Ravensburger games
German game designers